Gruiu may refer to several places in Romania:

Gruiu, a commune in Ilfov County
Gruiu, a village in Căteasca Commune, Argeș County
Gruiu, a village in Nucșoara Commune, Argeș County
Gruiu, a village administered by Budești town, Călărași County
Gruiu, a village in Făgețelu Commune, Olt County
Gruiu, a village in Stoenești Commune, Vâlcea County
Gruiu Lupului, a village in Racoviţa Commune, Vâlcea County

See also 
 Grui (disambiguation)